Pamukova is a town and district of Sakarya Province in the Marmara region of Turkey. The mayor is Ibrahim Guven Ovun (SP).

References

Populated places in Sakarya Province
Districts of Sakarya Province
Pamukova District